Edward Mosley may refer to:

 Edward Mosley (MP for Preston) (died 1638), English lawyer and politician
 Sir Edward Mosley, 2nd Baronet (1639–1665), English politician

See also
 Edward Moseley (1682/83–1749), Surveyor General, later Treasurer, of North Carolina